Sylwester Bednarek (born 28 April 1989) is a Polish high jumper. He won the bronze medal at the 2009 World Championships and gold at the 2017 European Indoor Championships.

Life and career 
Bednarek was born in Łódź. He finished fourth at the 2005 World Youth Championships and the 2006 World Junior Championships, finished sixth at the 2007 European Junior Championships and won the silver medal at the 2008 World Junior Championships. He also competed at the 2009 European Indoor Championships without reaching the final. He underwent knee surgery due to an injury in 2010 and returned to competition. He was tenth at the 2010 European Athletics Championships but pain persisted in his knee into the 2011 season and he decided to undergo further surgery with an eye on being in his best shape for the 2012 London Olympics. Unfortunately, at the national championships soon before the Games, he ruptured the Achilles tendon in his other leg and only returned to competition in 2013. In 2017, he won the gold medal at the European Indoor Championships in Belgrade.

His personal best jump is 2.32 metres, achieved in August 2009 in Berlin at the World Championships. He has achieved 2.33 metres indoors, a mark set in February 2017 in Banska Bystrica.

For his sport achievements, he received:
 Golden Cross of Merit in 2009.

Competition record

Personal bests
Outdoor: 2.32 m (2009)
Indoor: 2.33 m (2017)

References

1989 births
Living people
Polish male high jumpers
Sportspeople from Łódź
World Athletics Championships medalists
World Athletics Championships athletes for Poland
Athletes (track and field) at the 2016 Summer Olympics
Olympic athletes of Poland